RAID: World War II is a multiplayer first-person shooter video game that lets players team up as the Raid crew and fight through events of World War II. The game was developed by Lion Game Lion and was published by Starbreeze Studios for Microsoft Windows.

Synopsis
During World War II, the Nazis are on the verge of winning the war in Europe. Four prisoners of war – Sterling, Rivet, Kurgan and Wolfgang have been freed by "Mrs. White", a British Intelligence Operative, who needs someone to take down Hitler and Nazi Germany. Their objective is to fight the war without rules or mercy. Their reward is all the Nazi gold they can carry.

Development
RAID: World War II was developed by Lion Game Lion, a Croatian Starbreeze partner studio, that has developed downloadable content for Payday 2. The team chose to work with Diesel, an engine made by Overkill Software (ex-Grin Studios), because they have an extensive experience on working with the engine. The game has a budget of US$8 million, financed by Starbreeze Studios.

Reception
On Metacritic, it has an aggregate score of 53% on PC, 46% on Playstation 4 and Xbox One. IGN gave the game a score of 5.0. PlayStation Lifestyle given a score of 5.5/10. Push Square rate 2/10. TheSixthAxis rated the game, 3 out of 10. Game informer given a score of 4 out of 10.

References

External links
 Official website
 Lion Game Lion homepage
 Starbreeze homepage

2017 video games
Multiplayer and single-player video games
World War II first-person shooters
Video games developed in Croatia
PlayStation 4 games
Windows games
Xbox One games
Tactical shooter video games
505 Games games
Starbreeze Studios games